Olena Ivanivna Teliha (July 21, 1906 – February 21, 1942) was a Ukrainian poet and Ukrainian activist of Ukrainian and Belarusian ethnicity.

Biography
Olena Teliha was born in the village of Ilyinskoe, near Moscow in Russia where her parents spent summer vacations. There are several villages by this name in that area, and it is unknown exactly which one of them is Olena Teliha's birthplace. Her father was a civil engineer while her mother came from a family of Russian Orthodox priests. In 1918, she moved to Kyiv with her family, when her father became a minister in the new UNR government. There they lived through the years of Ukrainian War of Independence. When the Bolsheviks took over, her father moved to Czechoslovakia, and the rest of the family followed him in 1923. After living through the rise and fall of Ukrainian National Republic, Olena took an avid interest in Ukrainian language and literature. In Prague, she attended a Ukrainian teacher's college where she studied history and philology. She met a group of young Ukrainian poets in Prague and started writing poetry herself. After her marriage, she moved to Warsaw, Poland, where she lived until the start of the Second World War.  In 1939, like many of the young Ukrainians with whom she associated, Olena Teliha became a member of the Organization of Ukrainian Nationalists, within which she became an activist in cultural and educational matters. 

In 1941, Olena and her husband Mykhailo Teliha (whom she met and married in Czechoslovakia) moved back to Nazi-occupied Kyiv, where she expanded her work as a cultural and literary activist, heading the Ukrainian Writers' Guild and editing a weekly cultural and arts newspaper "Litavry". A lot of her activities were in open defiance of the Nazi authorities. She watched her closest colleagues from the parent-newspaper "Ukrainian Word" ("Ukrayins'ke Slovo") get arrested and yet chose to ignore the dangers.  She refused to flee, declaring that she would never again go into exile.

She was finally arrested by the Gestapo and executed, aged 35, in Babi Yar in Kyiv along with her husband. In the prison cell where she stayed, her last written words were scribbled on the wall: "Here was interred and from here goes to her death Olena Teliha".

Poetry 

 "Only the evening flies over the city"
 Joy
 Abroad
 Life
 To men
 I. Someone else's spring
 II. Sleepy day
 III. Blazing day
 Everlasting
 Turn
 Tango
 Cossack
 Travel
 "No need for words. Let there be only business..."
 Summer
 Loyalty
 "The night was turbulent and dim..."
 "My soul and a dark drink..."
 "Not love, not a whim and not an adventure..."
 To a man
 "Sharp eyes open in the dark..."
 "Today every step would like to be a waltz..."
 A unique holiday
 On the fifth floor
 "They wave their hand! Pour the wine..."
 Reply
 "I will not forgive the hand that hit me..."
 Immortal
 Fifteenth autumn
 Evening song
 Black square
 Letter
 "Everything - but not this! Not these peaceful days..."
 On the eve [Two sonnets]
 A sunny memory
 1933—1939
 Convicted

Remembrance

On July 19, 2007 the National bank of Ukraine issued a commemorative coin dedicated to Olena Teliha.

On 25 February 2017 a monument to Teliha was unveiled at Babi Yar. The monument was consecrated by head of the Ukrainian Orthodox Church of the Kyivan Patriarchate Patriarch Filaret.

See also
 List of Ukrainians
 Culture of Ukraine
 Ukrainian literature

References

External links
 Olena Teliha's poems. 
Life is not to be sold for a few pieces of silver – The life of Olena Teliha, CYM, the Ukrainian Youth Association

1906 births
1942 deaths
Executed people from Moscow Oblast
Ukrainian poets
Ukrainian murder victims
People murdered in Reichskommissariat Ukraine
Ukrainian people of Belarusian descent
Organization of Ukrainian Nationalists
20th-century Ukrainian women politicians
Ukrainian people executed by Nazi Germany
Ukrainian nationalists
Executed Soviet people from Russia
Ukrainian women in World War II
20th-century poets
Ukrainian women writers
20th-century women writers
Soviet poets